The Department of Police and Customs was an Australian government department that existed between March and December 1975.

History
The department was established while the Whitlam Government was in power. Shortly after the Fraser Government took office in November 1975, following the 1975 Australian constitutional crisis, the Department was abolished.

Scope
Information about the department's functions and/or government funding allocation could be found in the Administrative Arrangements Orders, the annual Portfolio Budget Statements and in the Department's annual reports.

At its creation, the Department's functions were:
Police forces of the Northern Territory of Australia, the Australian Capital Territory and Norfolk Island
Duties of Customs and Excise Bounties on the production or export of goods.

Structure
The department was a Commonwealth Public Service department, staffed by officials who were responsible to the Minister for Police and Customs. The Secretary of the department was Alan Carmody.

References

Ministries established in 1975
Police and Customs